The following lists events that happened in 2016 in the Republic of the Union of Myanmar.

Incumbents
 President: Thein Sein (until March 30), Htin Kyaw (starting March 30)
 First Vice President: Sai Mauk Kham (until March 30), Myint Swe (starting March 30) 
 Second Vice President: Nyan Tun (until March 30), Henry Van Thio (starting March 30)
 State Counsellor: Aung San Suu Kyi (starting April 6)

Events

February
 February 1 - The second session of House of Representatives, the lower house of the parliament convenes.
 February 3 - The second session of House of Nationalities, the upper house of the parliament convenes.
 February 8 - The second session of Assembly of the Union (Union Parliament) convenes
 February 8 - The second session of State and Regional Hluttaws convene.

March
 March 30 - Htin Kyaw became the President of Myanmar.

April
 April 6 - Aung San Suu Kyi assumed the newly created role of the State Counsellor, a position similar to Prime Minister.

August
Several temples in the nearby ancient city of Bagan were damaged and four people were reported dead.

Predicted and scheduled events

November
 November 19 - Myanmar along with the Philippines begins hosting the group stages of the 2016 AFF Championship.

References

 
Burma
Years of the 21st century in Myanmar
Burma
2010s in Myanmar